In early July 2005, Hurricane Dennis brushed Jamaica, bringing torrential rain and damaging floods to the island nation. Forming from a tropical depression on July 4, Dennis began impacting Jamaica three days later. Approximately 6,000 people evacuated from coastal and flood-prone areas prior to the storm's arrival while relief agencies allocated resources for recovery operations. Widespread flooding and landslides damaged homes and isolated communities. Saint Thomas and Portland Parishes were hardest-hit; hundreds required evacuation as multiple rivers burst their banks.

Overall, 209,000 people were affected with 6,000 households requesting assistance. A week after Dennis, Hurricane Emily brought further rain to the island, exacerbating damage. Their combined effects damaged or destroyed 440 homes with total losses reaching J$5.976 billion (US$96.87 million), of which at least J$2.128 billion (US$34.5 million) can be attributed to Dennis alone. One person died due to flooding. Relief operations began before the hurricane subsided, and international communities provided further aid. The overall effects of Dennis were limited and the nation's economy sustained no major ramifications.

Background and preparations

On July 4, 2005, the National Hurricane Center classified a tropical depression near the Windward Islands. This system moved briskly to the west-northwest, becoming Tropical Storm Dennis the following day. Taking advantage of highly favorable environmental factors, such as low wind shear and high sea surface temperatures, Dennis rapidly intensified. By July 6, the system reached hurricane strength as it began traversing the Jamaica Channel. The system subsequently struck Cuba as a Category 4 twice before moving over the Gulf of Mexico. It ultimately moved inland over Florida as a Category 3 on July 10 and dissipated over the Great Lakes eight days later.

Late on July 5, the Government of Jamaica issued a hurricane watch for the nation as Dennis intensified over the eastern Caribbean. This was upgraded to a hurricane warning early on July 6. The warning remained in place for 48 hours as the hurricane brushed the island, being discontinued on July 8 as Dennis moved over northern Cuba and no longer posed a direct threat to Jamaica.

Following the issuance of the hurricane warning, Jamaica's National Emergency Operations Center and Parish Emergency Operations Center were activated. At the behest of Jamaica's Office of Disaster Preparedness and Emergency Management, the Caribbean Disaster Emergency Management Agency allocated resources to assist the nation following the passage of Dennis. The Jamaican Red Cross also notified its branches of the storm, placing personnel and volunteers on standby on July 7. The Jamaica Defence Force Coast Guard assisted with evacuations of Pedro Bank and Morant Cays. Shelters prepped for opening by the evening of July 6 and Norman Manley International Airport ceased operations at 04:00 UTC (11:00 p.m. local time) and Sangster International Airport following soon thereafter.

By July 7, 30 shelters opened across five parishes, with at least 793 people using their services. Some officials complained that residents refused to evacuate. However, as the storm impacted the island this number dramatically increased to 6,000 people with shelters open in all parishes. Approximately J$25 million (US$405,000) was made available for relief operations through the nation's Disaster Mitigation Programme. An additional J$20 million (US$324,000) was allocated for clearing drains in preparation for heavy rain.

Impact

Hurricane Dennis brought torrential rainfall to most of Jamaica, which already experienced above-average rainfall since April, as it brushed the island to the northeast. The latter value equates to a 1-in-50 year event for the town and was 1,005% of the 30-year mean. Rainfall in Constant Spring reached 1-in-25 year levels. These winds downed trees and power lines, leaving roughly 100,000 customers without electricity; however, overall wind damage was minimal. Several homes and business lost their roofs.

Saint Thomas Parish suffered widespread flooding as multiple rivers burst their banks. The first to flood was the Yallahs River. A bridge spanning the river was severely damaged. The nearby Mundicot River prompted multiple evacuations in Yallahs while Johnson River flooded much of Seaforth. Evacuations also took place in Bull Bay where graves were unearthed. Sixty-seven homes in the Taylor Land subdivision of Bull Bay were affected, prompting a proposal to relocate residents elsewhere to avoid future damage. Overflow from tributaries of the Cane River inundated multiple villages, leaving many isolated. One person drowned after being swept away in the Negro River; his body was recovered three days later. The community of Eight Miles remained under  a day after the hurricane's passage. The severity of flooding was blamed on poor building and maintenance of retaining walls along gullies.

Landslides in Portland Parish rendered roads impassable and damaged many homes. A bridge spanning the Rio Grande, connecting eastern and western sides of the parish, was severely damaged. The severed connection left 500 people temporarily isolated. Elsewhere along the river, three homes and two stores were swept away. A landslide in Mill Bank destroyed eight homes. Agriculture sustained significant damage, with effects compounded by the quick succession of Dennis and Emily a week apart. Along the Rio Grande, the entire banana crop was lost. The two storms wrecked  of crops and killed 4,330 livestock, mostly chickens, at a cost of J$250 million (US$4.05 million).

Two homes along the Mamee River in Saint Andrew Parish were swept away while other residents in mountainous areas of the parish were stranded by landslides. Multiple residents became trapped within Gordon Town and hazardous weather hampered their rescue. A bridge in Mahoneyvale was destroyed. During the pre-dawn hours of July 9, the Annotto, Pencar, and Motherford rivers burst their banks in Saint Mary Parish; more than 500 people relocated from their homes in Annotto Bay. Flooding took place across much of Saint Catherine Parish with eight people requiring rescue. The Cobrun Gully submerged several homes in Bushy Park. Eastern areas of Clarendon Parish experienced significant flooding, with several communities cut-off or inundated. A sink hole in Halse Hall engulfed 35 homes. An oil tank overflowed due to heavy rain at a Petrojam Refinery in Kingston Harbour resulting in a minor oil spill. Petrojam crews cleaned the spill within a day. Some streets in downtown Kingston were flooded. Effects in Trelawny Parish were relatively limited, with J$16 million (US$259,000) in agricultural damage.

In all, an estimated 209,000 people were affected to varying degrees across 121 communities in the nation. Approximately 6,000 households—an estimated 22,000 people—reported need for assistance; the combined effects of Dennis and Emily left 49 homes destroyed and 391 damaged. Associated losses reached J$100 million (US$1.62 million) from Dennis. The agricultural industry sustained extensive losses, with  damaged and nearly 160,000 livestock, primarily chickens, killed. The rapid succession of Dennis and Emily makes differentiating damage between them difficult. Collectively, the two storms wrought J$5.976 billion (US$96.87 million) in damage, primarily stemming from infrastructure, of which at least J$2.128 billion (US$34.5 million) can be attributed to Dennis alone.

Aftermath
Distribution of relief supplies began on July 7. Isolated communities across Saint Andrew, Saint Thomas, and Portland Parishes received airlifted aid the following day. Residents in Cascade required evacuation by airlift and Mill Bank was declared a disaster area. A previously defunct railway bridge—the  St. Margaret's Bay bridge—in Portland Parish, not in use since the 1980s, was repaired at a cost of J$26 million (US$421,000) and re-opened on July 30 to enable travel after the Rio Grande bridge was damaged. Residents in the parish were also advised to temporarily boil or bleach water to prevent the spread of waterborne diseases due to contaminated supplies. The Salvation Army assisted with relief efforts. Efforts to repair and restore damaged roadways reached J$405 million (US$6.56 million). The Leader of the Opposition party requested the Jamaican government release J$500 million (US$8.1 million) for immediate relief; however, Prime Minister P. J. Patterson rejected the proposal. Joseph Hibbert further criticized the government for inadequately maintaining roads, citing a lack of maintenance contracts which is how such work is carried out in the nation. Although the Government of Jamaica indicated it would not request international assistance, the Government of Cuba provided 11 tons of supplies and Venezuela offered support.

WINDALCO reported a loss of 10,000 tons of aluminum due to flooding. Manufacturing companies reported J$18.3 million (US$296,000) in losses, primarily from suspended operations. In November, the Jamaica Labour Party sought J$3.2 billion (US$51.8 million) in additional funding to repair roads damaged by Hurricanes Ivan, Dennis, Emily, and Wilma. The following month, the Jamaica Agricultural Society received J$5.5 million (US$88,266) from the Japanese embassy to assist 500 farmers in Portland Parish. The long-term effects of Dennis were limited, with nearly every economic sector returning to normal within a few months. The only exceptions were exports of banana and coffee crops, both of which were still recovering from Hurricane Ivan in 2004. Overall implications to the nation's gross domestic product were negligible, merely flat-lining growth rather than causing decline. However, in combination with the effects of a drought early in 2005, inflation values required adjustment upwards from 9% to 14.3%.

See also

Hurricane Ivan (2004)
Hurricane Emily (2005)
2005 Atlantic hurricane season

References

External links
The National Hurricane Center's advisory archive for Hurricane Dennis
 for Hurricane Dennis

2005 in Jamaica
Dennis Jamaica
Hurricane Dennis
Dennis
Dennis Jamaica